Rudhaleh Rural District is in Rig District of Ganaveh County, Bushehr province, Iran. At the census of 2006, its population was 7,570 in 1,592 households; there were 7,844 inhabitants in 1,945 households at the following census of 2011; and in the most recent census of 2016, the population of the rural district was 7,573 in 2,163 households. The largest of its 27 villages was Chahar Rustai, with 2,365 people.

References 

Rural Districts of Bushehr Province
Populated places in Ganaveh County